The Pearl of Death is a 1944 Sherlock Holmes film starring Basil Rathbone as Holmes and Nigel Bruce as Dr. Watson, the ninth of fourteen such films the pair made. The story is loosely based on Conan Doyle's short story "The Adventure of the Six Napoleons" but features some additions, such as Evelyn Ankers as an accomplice of the villain, played by Miles Mander, and Rondo Hatton as a brutal killer.

Plot
Master criminal Giles Conover (Miles Mander) steals the famous "Borgia Pearl" from the Royal Regent Museum under the very nose of Sherlock Holmes and Dr. Watson, but when caught the pearl is not found on him, he is released.

Later, Holmes hears of an apparently motiveless murder. An elderly colonel is found with his back broken amid a pile of smashed china. Holmes takes an immediate interest in the case as the unusual method of killing is that of "The Hoxton Creeper" (Rondo Hatton), known to be Conover's right-hand man.

Another murder occurs, of a little old lady, also surrounded by smashed china. Conover makes two attempts to kill Holmes, who surmises that Conover is desperately trying to recover the stolen pearl.

After a third killing Holmes finds the common feature of each: a bust of Napoleon. Conover, when pursued by the police, had fled through the workshop where they were being made, and hid the pearl inside one of six identical busts.

Holmes tracks down the vendor of the busts and finds out that one is still unaccounted for, as does Conover's accomplice Naomi. Conover and The Creeper arrive at the house of the owner of the final bust, only to find that Holmes has taken his place. Overpowered, Holmes convinces The Creeper that Conover will double-cross him, and the Creeper turns on Conover and kills him, after which Holmes kills the Creeper, before the police finally arrive. Holmes smashes the final bust and recovers the pearl "with the blood of five more victims on it".

Cast

 Basil Rathbone as Sherlock Holmes
 Nigel Bruce as Dr. John H. Watson
 Evelyn Ankers as Naomi Drake
 Dennis Hoey as Inspector Lestrade
 Miles Mander as Giles Conover
 Ian Wolfe as Amos Hodder
 Charles Francis as Digby
 Holmes Herbert as James Goodram
 Richard Nugent as Bates
 Mary Gordon as Mrs. Hudson
 Rondo Hatton as The Creeper
 Wilson Benge as Second Ship's Steward 
 Billy Bevan as Constable 
 Harry Cording as George Gelder 
 Al Ferguson as Security Guard  
 Colin Kenny as Security Guard 
 Connie Leon as Ellen Carey 
 John Merkyl as Doctor Julien Boncourt 
 Leyland Hodgson as Customs Officer 
 Lillian Bronson as Harker's Housekeeper 
 Harold De Becker as Boss 
 Leslie Denison as Police Sergeant Murdock
 J.W. Austin as Police Sergeant Bleeker 
 Arthur Mulliner as Thomas Sandeford 
 Arthur Stenning as First Ship's Steward 
 Eric Wilton as Conover's Chauffeur
 Charles Knight as Bearded Man 
 Audrey Manners as Body of Teacher

The Creeper

Universal Studios attempted to capitalise on Rondo Hatton's effective portrayal of the Hoxton Creeper, casting him in two more (unrelated) films as "the Creeper": House of Horrors (filmed in 1945, but not released until 1946, after Hatton's death) and  The Brute Man (1946, also released posthumously).

A character called "The Golem," a direct reference to the Creeper, appears in the third episode of the first series of Sherlock. Like the Creeper, the Golem is a brutal assassin who crushes his victims with his bare hands.

References

External links
 
 
 
 
Review of film at Variety

1944 films
1944 mystery films
American mystery films
American detective films
Films based on short fiction
Sherlock Holmes films based on works by Arthur Conan Doyle
American black-and-white films
Universal Pictures films
Films directed by Roy William Neill
Films set in London
Films scored by Paul Sawtell
1940s English-language films
1940s American films